Max Kowalski (10 August 1882 – 4 June 1956) was a composer, singer and singing teacher.

Kowalski was born in Kowal, Poland. He moved with his family to Germany in 1883, a year after he was born. He studied law in Marburg, obtaining a doctorate and worked as a lawyer in Frankfurt am Main. There he studied singing as well as composition with Bernhard Sekles and published his first work, a musical version of Albert Giraud's Pierrot Lunaire (independently from Arnold Schoenberg's work of the same year), in 1912-13. He continued to compose and published until 1934, writing a large number of Lieder which were widely performed in Germany. In 1938, he was forced to give up his law practice and was imprisoned in the Buchenwald concentration camp. Upon his release in 1939, he emigrated to London, where he first worked as a piano tuner and synagogal cantor. Later he established himself as a singing teacher. He continued to compose, but none of his later songs was published. He died in 1956 in London.

Literature
 Baker's Biographical Dictionary of Musicians, (Nicolas Slonimsky, Editor) New York: G. Schirmer, 1958

External links
Guide to the Papers of Max Kowalski (1882-1956) at the Leo Baeck Institute, New York.

1882 births
1956 deaths
Polish composers
Emigrants from Congress Poland to Germany